Mark Lewis (born March 25, 1979) is an arena football placekicker who is currently a free agent. He has also played for the Tennessee Valley Vipers, Detroit Fury, Las Vegas Gladiators, Columbus Destroyers, Austin Wranglers, Dallas Vigilantes, Orlando Predators, Tampa Bay Storm and Baltimore Brigade. His no. 19 worn during his time with the Brigade is a tribute to the late Baltimore Colts great Johnny Unitas, who wore that number.

Early life
Lewis attended Lyman High School in Longwood, Florida, where he was a two sport athlete, participating soccer and football. Lewis was one of the top prep players in the state of Florida for soccer. He joined the football team after his friend, Joe Gioia, had dared Lewis that he couldn't kick a football as far as a soccer ball.

College career
Lewis continued his soccer career when he earned a scholarship to play at Florida International University. After one season at FIU, Lewis transferred to 
University of North Carolina at Charlotte, where he played a single season for the 49ers before quitting soccer.

Professional career
Lewis began playing professional football in 2003, when he signed with the Tennessee Valley Vipers of af2. Playing for the Austin Wranglers in 2007, Lewis enjoyed the best year of his career, earning First Team All-Arena honors and was named the AFL Kicker of the Year. On March 21, 2018, Lewis was assigned to the Baltimore Brigade. With the Brigade, Lewis won his second Kicker of the Year award in 2018.  On March 6, 2019, Lewis was assigned to the expansion Atlantic City Blackjacks.

References

External links
ArenaFan page

1979 births
Living people
People from Altamonte Springs, Florida
American football placekickers
FIU Panthers men's soccer players
Charlotte 49ers men's soccer players
Tennessee Valley Vipers players
Detroit Fury players
Las Vegas Gladiators players
Columbus Destroyers players
Austin Wranglers players
Dallas Vigilantes players
Orlando Predators players
Sportspeople from Seminole County, Florida
Players of American football from Florida
Tampa Bay Storm players
Baltimore Brigade players
Association footballers not categorized by position
Atlantic City Blackjacks players
Association football players not categorized by nationality